Horse Sport Ireland is the National Governing Body for all equestrian sport in Ireland and Northern Ireland. It is a 32-county body, and is therefore responsible for the administration of international competitions throughout the whole island. It also sanctions all Irish riders and horses competing abroad at international events, and implements
the rules and regulations laid down by the FEI. Horse Sport Ireland is composed of 15 Irish affiliate bodies, representing all facets of equestrian sport, and is also responsible for liaison with the Irish Sports Council, the Olympic Council of Ireland, the National Coaching and Training centre, the Department of Arts, Sport and Tourism, and other government agencies. These sports include the FEI recognized disciplines of show jumping, eventing, dressage, endurance riding, para-equestrian and carriage driving.  Horse Sport Ireland also provides a forum to bring member organisations together to discuss common issues, and it sanctions all international events in Ireland.

External links
Horse Sport Ireland

Equestrian organizations
Equestrian